Agap is a Russian male first name. The name is derived from the Greek name Agapios, which in turn derives from the verb , meaning "to love". The name's old form, as well as the form used by the Russian Orthodox Church, is Agapy. The nonstandard colloquial form Agapey was also used.

The diminutives of "Agap" are Agapka, Gapa, Aga, Aganya, Ganya, Agasha, and Gasha.

The patronymics derived from "Agap" are "" (Agapovich; masculine) and its colloquial form "" (Agapych), and "" (Avapovna; feminine).

See also
Agapit, a related name

References

Notes

Sources
А. В. Суперанская (A. V. Superanskaya). "Современный словарь личных имён: Сравнение. Происхождение. Написание" (Modern Dictionary of First Names: Comparison. Origins. Spelling). Айрис-пресс. Москва, 2005. 
Н. А. Петровский (N. A. Petrovsky). "Словарь русских личных имён" (Dictionary of Russian First Names). ООО Издательство "АСТ". Москва, 2005. 

